Lampay is an uninhabited tidal island in Loch Dunvegan, off the northwest coast of the Isle of Skye in Scotland.

It is separated from the "mainland" of Skye by a small sound called An Doirneil. It is not far from Claigan. The island doubles in size at low tide, and is really two islands connected by a thin isthmus. It is due south of Isay.

External links

Skye and Lochalsh
Tidal islands of Scotland
Uninhabited islands of Highland (council area)